A list of films produced in Argentina in 1995:

External links and references
 Argentine films of 1995 at the Internet Movie Database

1995
Argentine
Films